ENQ may refer to:
 Enga language
 EnQuest, a British petroleum company
 Enquiry character, in telecommunications